The following is a list of churches in Exeter.

Active churches 
The city has an estimated 64 churches for 129,800 inhabitants, a ratio of one church to every 2,028 people.

Defunct churches

External links 
 Map of medieval churches
 Histories of individual churches

Further reading
Orme, Nicholas (2014) The Churches of Medieval Exeter, Impress Books, ISBN 9781907605512.

References 

Exeter
 
Churches